The Westchester County Bar Association, established on February 11, 1896, is a not-for-profit corporation based in White Plains, New York, with a voluntary membership of more than 2,200 lawyers.

Organisation
The Association consists of seven Sections and more than sixty Committees, led by a team of Officers and Board of Directors. The current president through May 2019 is Richard S. Vecchio.

Activities
The bar association offers lawyer referrals to the public, and affords lawyers an opportunity to meet and interact with others in their field to enhance their practice. The association offers links to needed services such as court interpreters and online access to legal forms.

The WCBA provides attorney, affiliate, and law student members with opportunities to help shape Westchester's legal community and to maintain the high standards of the legal profession. The society publishes a monthly magazine, and information is available through regular mailings and online. The Westchester Bar Journal is published annually and also available online.

External links
 Westchester County Bar Association website

American bar associations
1896 establishments in New York (state)
Organizations established in 1896